|}

The Moyglare Stud Stakes is a Group 1 flat horse race in Ireland open to two-year-old thoroughbred fillies. It is run at the Curragh over a distance of 7 furlongs (1,408 metres), and it is scheduled to take place each year in late August or early September.

History
The event is named after its long-term sponsor, Moyglare Stud. It was formerly contested over 6 furlongs, and for a period it held Group 3 status. It was promoted to Group 2 level in 1979, and to Group 1 in 1983. Its distance was extended to 7 furlongs in 1992. In 2014 it became part of the Irish Champions Weekend fixture.

The Moyglare Stud Stakes became part of the Breeders' Cup Challenge series in 2009. The winner of the race now earns an automatic invitation to compete in the same year's Breeders' Cup Juvenile Fillies Turf.

Records
Leading jockey since 1973 (4 wins):
 Christy Roche – Tender Camilla (1974), Petipa (1975), Daness (1979), Arctique Royale (1980)

Leading trainer since 1973 (9 wins):
 Aidan O'Brien – Sequoyah (2000), Quarter Moon (2001), Necklace (2003), Rumplestiltskin (2005), Misty for Me (2010), Maybe (2011), Minding (2015), Happily (2017), Love (2019)

Leading owner since 1980 (9 wins): (includes part ownership)
 Sue Magnier – Sequoyah (2000), Necklace (2003), Rumplestiltskin (2005), Again (2008), Misty for Me (2010), Maybe (2011), Minding (2015), Happily (2017), Love (2019)

Winners since 1980

Earlier winners

 1970: What's a Name
 1971: Princess Bonita
 1972: Where You Lead
 1973: Milly Whiteway
 1974: Tender Camilla
 1975: Petipa
 1976: Regal Ray
 1977: Ridaness
 1978: Phil's Fancy
 1979: Daness

See also
 Horse racing in Ireland
 List of Irish flat horse races

References

 Paris-Turf: 
 Racing Post:

 galopp-sieger.de – Moyglare Stud Stakes.
 horseracingintfed.com – International Federation of Horseracing Authorities – Moyglare Stud Stakes (2018).
 irishracinggreats.com – Moyglare Stud Stakes (Group 1).
 pedigreequery.com – Moyglare Stud Stakes – Curragh.

Flat races in Ireland
Curragh Racecourse
Flat horse races for two-year-old fillies
Breeders' Cup Challenge series